Richard Juien-Dah Pan (born October 28, 1965) is an American Democratic politician and physician who served in the California State Senate from 2014 to 2022, representing the 6th Senate district, which encompassed parts of Sacramento and Yolo counties. He is also a practicing pediatrician.

Pan was Chair of the California Asian American & Pacific Islander Legislative Caucus. Prior to being elected to the State Senate in 2014, he was a member of the California State Assembly representing the 5th Assembly District, and after the 2010 redistricting, the 9th Assembly District.

Early life and education
Pan was born in Yonkers, New York and raised in Pittsburgh to immigrant parents from Taiwan.

Legislative career
Following a measles outbreak that began in California and infected 131 people, Pan and Senator Ben Allen introduced California Senate Bill 277 in 2015, which eliminated philosophical and religious beliefs exemptions to vaccine requirements for California school children. The bill passed and was signed into law by Governor Jerry Brown. Pan authored laws to expand newborn screening for severe combined immunodeficiency syndrome (AB395 in 2011), adrenoleukodystrophy (AB1559 in 2014) and all conditions recommended by the federal DHHS Recommended Universal Screening Panel (SB1095 in 2016). Pan authored legislation to extend the California Children's Services Program managed care carve-out (AB301 in 2011) and to establish the Medi-Cal Children's Health Advisory Board to guide Medi-Cal policy affecting children (AB357 in 2014). In 2021 he authored a law (SB 742) that makes illegal to "harass, intimidate, injure or obstruct" people who are on their way to get a vaccination; the law was inspired by an incident in January when protesters targeted and briefly shut down a mass vaccination site in Los Angeles.

References

1965 births
Living people
American pediatricians
American politicians of Taiwanese descent
California politicians of Chinese descent
Educators from California
Harvard School of Public Health alumni
Johns Hopkins University alumni
Democratic Party members of the California State Assembly
Politicians from Sacramento, California
University of California, Davis faculty
University of Pittsburgh School of Medicine alumni
21st-century American politicians
People from Yonkers, New York
Politicians from Pittsburgh